(lit. "Majisuka Academy") is a Japanese television drama series about high school delinquents, starring members of idol group AKB48.

The first season aired in 2010 on TV Tokyo. A second season Majisuka Gakuen 2 was aired the following year.

The third season was set in a different continuity from the previous seasons and was aired on July 13, 2012.

In 2015, the series moved to NTV and the fourth season, which returned to the same continuity as seasons 1 and 2, was aired on January 19, 2015. On the same year, a fifth season was announced and for the first time will be aired exclusively on internet, by the streaming site Hulu (only in the US and Japan), because NTV will broadcast only the first two episodes (August 24), due to various scenes of violence, which does not justify full season showing on TV.

A special spin-off from the fourth and fifth seasons of the series, titled , is a prequel to season 4. It was the first to feature members of HKT48 as the main cast and was produced in collaboration with the rock group Kishidan. It was aired on November 28, 2015, on NTV at 25:05 JST and run for half an hour.

Another spinoff titled Kyabasuka Gakuen was aired in 2016. It was set after the events of season 4 and was an alternate continuity to season 5. In a departure from the fist fighting theme of previous seasons, it saw the cast opening and running a hostess club.

The latest iteration of the series is Majimuri Gakuen, aired in July 2018, which featured an entirely new cast and continuity and set at a different school.

Seasons

1st Season Cast

Majisuka All-Girls High School

Homeroom 2-C
Transfer Students
Atsuko Maeda as Atsuko Maeda
Nachu as Daruma Onizuka
Team Hormone
Rino Sashihara as Wota
Rie Kitahara as Unagi
Aki Takajo as Akicha
Moeno Nito as Bungee
Mika Komori as Mukuchi

Rappapa (Wind Instrument Club) - "Top of Majijo"
Yuko Oshima as Yuko Oshima, Rappapa Head
Mariko Shinoda as Sado, Rappapa 2nd in Command
Four Heavenly Queens
Haruna Kojima as Torigoya
Rena Matsui as Gekikara
Yuki Kashiwagi as Black
Tomomi Itano as Shibuya
1st Year Students
Sayaka Nakaya as Anime
Miku Tanabe as Jumbo
Rumi Yonezawa as Rice
Haruka Katayama as Showa

Other Students
3rd Year
Sayaka Akimoto as Chokoku
2nd Year
Minami Minegishi as Minami Minegishi, Student Council President
Kabuki Sisters
Tomomi Kasai as Ookabuki
Asuka Kuramochi as Shoukabuki
Sae Miyazawa as Gakuran
1st Year
Sanshou Shimai
Aika Oota as Love-tan
Manami Oku as Manamana
Miho Miyazaki as Myao
Mayu Watanabe as Nezumi
Erena Ono as Erena
Jurina Matsui as Center
Kumi Yagami as Dance
Kinmayu-Kai
Miho Wakizawa as Leader (Unnamed)
Mayu Co. as Unnamed Officer
Anzu Momoto as Unnamed Member
Anzu Ikehata as Unnamed Member
SHIN-YONG as Unnamed Member
Sonomi Miyahayashi as Unnamed Member

Yabakune All-Girls High School
Asami Hihara as School Gang Leader
Natsu Andou as Migiude (2nd in Command)
Amina Sato as Chiharu
Yukari Sato as Sanae

Other Casts
Eri Fuse as Yuriko Nojima (Majisuka all-girls school principal, ex-Rappapa Leader)
Masahiro Komoto as Yoshiro Maeda (Maeda's father)
Sawa Suzuki as Sachiko Maeda (Maeda's mother, ex-Yabakune Leader)
Toru Tezuka as Kiken (Majisuka all-girls high school doctor)
Susumu Kobayashi as Kuuki (Majisuka all-girls high school math teacher 2-C)
Minami Takahashi as Minami Ono

2nd Season Cast

Majisuka All-Girls High School

Rappapa (Wind Instrument Club) - "Top of Majijo"
Yui Yokoyama as Otabe, Rappapa Head
Atsuko Maeda as Atsuko Maeda, Rappapa 2nd in Command
The Big 4
Rena Matsui as Amakuchi/Chuukara/Gekikara
Sae Miyazawa as Youran
Minami Minegishi as Shaku (Ex.Student Council President)
Kabuki Sisters (Nou・Kyougen Sisters)
Asuka Kuramochi as Shoukabuki
Tomomi Kasai as Ookabuki
Nachu as Daruma Onizuka
Team Hormone
Rino Sashihara as Wota
Rie Kitahara as Unagi
Moeno Nito as Bungee
Mika Komori as Mukuchi
Aki Takajo as Akicha

Tsu no Ji Rengou
Mayu Watanabe as Nezumi
Jurina Matsui as Center

Other Students
2nd Year
Team Under
Rumi Tonezawa as Rice
Miku Tanabe as Jumbo
Sayaka Nakaya as Anime
Haruka Katayama as Showa
Team Fondue
Mina Oba as Toshima
Haruka Shimada as Docchi
Haruka Shimazaki as Kanburi
Suzuran Yamauchi as Tsuri
Miori Ichikawa as Lemon

Majisuka Graduates
Yuko Oshima as Yuko Oshima, Ex-Rappapa Head
Mariko Shinoda as Sado, Ex-Rappapa 2nd in Command
Haruna Kojima as Torigoya, Ex-Rappapa Big 4
Yuki Kashiwagi as Black, Ex-Rappapa Big 4
Tomomi Itano as Shibuya, Ex-Rappapa Big 4
Sayaka Akimoto as Chokoku

Yabakune All-Girls High School
Hadashi no Kai (Habu)
3rd Year
Tomomi Itano as Shibuya, Ex-Rappapa Big 4
Amina Sato as Chiharu
Yukari Sato as Sanae
Mayumi Uchida as Janken
2nd Year
Kumi Yagami as Dance
Mariya Nagao as Mariyagi
Sumire Sato as Sanshoku
Ayaka Kikuchi as Comeback
Ami Maeda as Mayuge
Sanshou Shimai Nimaiba
Miho Miyazaki as Myao
Aika Oota as Love-tan
1st Year
Kanon Kimoto as Miso

Other Students
Misaki Iwasa as Misaki
Shizuka Ooya as Shizuka
Haruka Nakagawa as Haruka (ハルカ)
Natsumi Matsubara as Natsumi (ナツミ)
Ayaka Umeda as Ayaka (アヤカ)
Tomomi Nakatsuka as Tomomi
Misato Nonaka as Misato
Reina Fujie as Reina
Sakiko Matsui as Sakiko
Haruka Ishida as Haruka (はるか)
Kana Kobayashi as Kana
Shihori Suzuki as Shihori
Natsuki Sato as Natsuki (ナツキ)
Natsumi Hirajima as Natsumi (なつみ)
Yuka Masuda as Yuka
Anna Mori as Anna (あんな)
Rina Izuta as Izu
Rena Kato as Rena
Rina Kawaei as Rina
Natsuki Kojima as Natsuki (なつき)
Marina Kobayashi as Marina
Wakana Natori as Wakana
Nana Fujita as Nana
Ayaka Morikawa as Ayaka (あやか)

Yabakune Graduates
Asami Hihara as Ex-School Gang Leader
Natsu Andou as Migiude (Ex-2nd in Command)

Sutegoro High School
Shiori Nakamata as Nakamata
Maria Abe as Maria
Anna Iriyama as Anna (アンナ)
Miyu Takeuchi as Miyu
Mariko Nakamura as Mariko

Others
Minami Takahashi as Police Inspector
Yuko Oshima as Yuka / Yuki Oshima

3rd Season Cast

Prison "HOPE"

Team Habu
Haruka Shimazaki as Paru
Yuria Kizaki as Peace
Mina Oba as Daasu
Kumi Yagami as Komimi
Rina Kawaei as Nanashi
Kanon Kimoto as Nantene
Maria Abe as Tetsuo
Haruka Shimada as Uruseeyo
Jurina Matsui as Nobunaga

Team Mongoose
Anna Iriyama as An'nin
Miyu Takeuchi as Miyu
Rena Kato as Shokakku
Miori Ichikawa as Sudachi
Suzuran Yamauchi as Bunker
Juri Takahashi as Messi
Mariya Nagao as Yagi
Anna Murashige as Jovijovich

Other Prisoners
Rie Kitahara, Shiori Nakamata, Yuka Tano, Karen Iwata, Mariko Nakamura, and Akane Takayanagi as Unnamed Prisoners

Prison Staff
Yoriko Douguchi as Prison Head
Yasuji Kimura as Nozomu Dedokoro, Prison Warden
Koiku Misawa, Tomoyasu Yamamoto, Daisuke Hibari, Yuichiro Suzuki, and Kenzo Fukutsu as Jailers

Others
Kazuki Fukuyama as Keita Yoyogi

4th Season Cast

Majisuka All-Girls High School
Sakura Miyawaki as Sakura Miyawaki, 2nd Year Transfer Student from Kagoshima

Rappapa (Wind Instrument Club) - "Top of Majijo"
Haruka Shimazaki as Salt, Rappapa Head
Four Heavenly Queens
Yui Yokoyama as Otabe
Rina Kawaei as Bakamono
Anna Iriyama as Yoga
Yuria Kizaki as Magic

Team Hinabe (2nd Year)
Juri Takahashi as Uonome
Ryoka Oshima as Kusogaki
Mion Mukaichi as Jisedai
Rena Kato as Dodobusu
Natsuki Uchiyama as Kenpou

Kamisori & Zombie (1st Year)
Nana Owada as Zombie
Mako Kojima as Kamisori

Other students

3rd Year
Rino Sashihara as Scandal (repeating 3rd Year)

2nd Year
Karen Iwata as Masamune
Chiyori Nakanishi as Busakawa
Mizuki Tsuchiyasu as Yosakoi
Yuiri Murayama as Dokuringo
Nana Okada as Katabutsu
Hikari Hashimoto as Muneatsu
Rena Nozawa as Perapera
Seina Fukuoka as Hidarī
Rina Izuta as Yanzuna
Saho Iwatate as Erinki
Wakana Natori as Ojou
Rina Hirata as Kurofune
Moe Goto as Uirou
Miyabi Ino as Meshiuma
Ayano Umeta as Umeta
Moe Aigasa as Yankee
Miki Nishino as Over 
Miori Ichikawa as Lemon
Mitsuki Maeda as Dekakawa
Natsuki Kojima as Eikō
Manami Ichikawa as Sabasaba
Mayu Ogasawara as Biriken
Haruka Shimada as Shimada

Gekioko High School Nursing Department

3rd Year
Sayaka Yamamoto as Antonio, School Gang Head
Miyuki Watanabe as Coby, 2nd in Command

2nd Year
Akari Suda as Tsurishi
Marika Tani as KY
Kaori Matsumura as Zakoboss
Miru Shiroma as Shirogiku
Fuuko Yagura as Kurobara

Year Unknown (Most Likely 1st Year)
Nao Furuhata as Diva
Rina Kondo as Bukkomi
Kei Jonishi as Demekin
Natsumi Tanaka as 170
Anna Murashige as Siberia
Shu Yabushita as Kimotama 
Kanako Kadowaki as Ibukuro 
Anna Ijiri as Ijirī
Eriko Jo as Joe
Sae Murase as Tekitō
Mai Fuchigami as Otenki
Serina Kumazawa as Hamster
Airi Tanigawa as Handsome
Michelle Christo Kusnadi as Michelle

Casual Diner: Asobina
Minami Takahashi as Minami, Owner, Majisuka Graduate

Majisuka Graduates
Haruna Kojima as Kojiharu, Ex.Rappapa Big 4
Nachu as Daruma Onizuka, Housewife
Jurina Matsui as Center, Nurse
Mayu Watanabe as Nezumi

Yabakune All-Girls High School
Mariya Nagao as Gekkou, New Gang Head
Tomu Mutō as Tsun
Saya Kawamoto as Rookie

4th Season Gaiden
Episodes

5th Season Cast

Majisuka All-Girls High School
Jurina Matsui as Center, Transfer Student; She quit being a nurse after she saw the news of Salt killed by an assassin.
Haruka Kodama as Katsuzetsu, Transfer Student

Rappapa (Wind Instrument Club) - "Top of Majijo"
Haruka Shimazaki as Salt, Rappapa Head
Four Heavenly Queens
Sakura Miyawaki as Sakura Miyawaki, Vice-Rappapa Head
Yui Yokoyama as Otabe
Anna Iriyama as Yoga
Yuria Kizaki as Magic

Team Hinabe
Juri Takahashi as Uonome
Ryoka Oshima as Kusogaki
Mion Mukaichi as Jisedai
Rena Kato as Dodobusu
Natsuki Uchiyama as Kenpou

1st Year Students
Nana Owada as Zombie
Mako Kojima as Kamisori

Other students
Nana Okada as Katabutsu

Gekioko High School Nursing Department
Sayaka Yamamoto as Antonio, School Gang Head
Miyuki Watanabe as Coby, 2nd in Command
Akari Suda as Tsurishi
Marika Tani as KY
Kaori Matsumura as Zakoboss
Miru Shiroma as Shirogiku
Fuuko Yagura as Kurobara
Akari Yoshida as Red
Kei Jonishi as Demekin

Yabakune All-Girls High School
Megu Taniguchi as Head, Fifteenth generation General
Nao Furuhata as Snake
Mariya Nagao as Gekkou
Tomu Mutō as Kaibun
Saya Kawamoto as Rookie
Yuiri Murayama as Candy
Yuka Tano as Amon

Casual Diner: Asobina
Minami Takahashi as Minami, Owner, Majisuka Graduate

Majisuka Graduates
Rina Kawaei as Bakamono, Ex.Rappapa Four Heavenly Queens

Cameo appearance
Miyu Omori as Kaidan (ep.1), Cloud (ep.9)
Ayana Shinozaki as Donkame (ep.1)
Atsuko Maeda as Atsuko Maeda (ep.2)
Yuko Oshima as Yuka Oshima (ep.2)
Yuki Kashiwagi as Black (ep.2)
Mayu Watanabe as Nezumi (ep.2)
Haruna Kojima as Torigoya/Kojiharu (ep.2)
Miyabi Ino as Meshiuma (ep.9)
Ayaka Okada as Okamochi (ep.9)
Haruka Shimada as Okami (ep.9)
Karen Iwata as Anison (ep.9)
Rena Nozawa as Speak (ep.9)
Miki Nishino as Chicken (ep.9)
Miona Hori as Nogi Female Student (ep.10)

5th Season Gaiden
Episodes

Spin-Off Season: 0: Kisarazu Rantōhen

Shekarashika Joshi Shōgyō
Sakura Miyawaki as Sakura Miyawaki; In prior to change school to Majisuka All-Girls High School, her hair is a long ponytail before it was cut short. She also tried to avoid fighting other Yankee.
Haruka Kodama as Katsuzetsu; Always together with Sakura.
Rino Sashihara as Ageman, Show's ex. girlfriend. She was previously a former Majisuka student of Team Hormone's leader as Wota. 
Chihiro Anai as Neji
Yui Kojina as Narushi
Riko Sakaguchi as Fukurotoji
Meru Tashima as Megaphone
Miku Tanaka as Otona
Natsumi Matsuoka as Oshiri
Nako Yabuki as Namaiki
Aika Ota as Ogi
Mio Tomonaga as Bōyomi
Mai Fuchigami as Chikoku
Aoi Motomura as Gōkyū
Madoka Moriyasu as Kakuni
Emiri Yamashita as Katakana

Kisarazu Yankee Corps
Show Ayanocozey as Show, Ageman's ex.boyfriend
Hikaru Saotome as Mimiuchi
Hitomi Saionji as Teigaku
Hoshi Grandmarnier as Taigaku
Shouchikubai Shiratori as Master

Kyabasuka Gakuen (2016)

Majimuri Gakuen (2018) 

The story is set at Utopia Arashigaoka, a new town created by the real estate company Gosaki Land. In the Arashigaoka Gakuen private school, the students are divided into  and  statuses with a strict social hierarchy, with Aran Gosaki, also known as Kaiser (Hinata Honma), at the top as the student council president. Sayuri "Lily" Shimizu (Yui Oguri), a mysterious girl with formidable fighting skills, transferred to the school and become friends with Hina Asahi (Rin Okabe), Ikumi "Bara" Kuwabara (Mion Mukaichi), and Sumire Yamamoto (Narumi Kuranoo).

Unlike previous installments, this season features co-educational schools and brawls between female and male students. Some of the male fighters are portrayed by real-life pro wrestlers and martial artists, such as kickboxer Yasuhiro Kido, pro wrestler Yukio Sakaguchi, and former Estonian sumo wrestler Baruto Kaito.

The series was adapted into a stage play, which was performed on October 19–28, 2018 at the Nippon Seinenkan Hall, Tokyo. The stage play returned to an all-female cast lineup, and with the exception of Yui Kojina of HKT48 and the guest stars, all the named characters were portrayed by AKB48 members. Nana Okada portrayed the main antagonist, Nero.

Majimuri Gakuen: Rai (2021) 
In February 2021, it was announced that a second stage play, titled  would be produced and performed in the end of March. This stage play would be part of the seventh anniversary celebration of AKB48 Team 8, of which most of the series' main cast are members, and all the regular characters would be portrayed by members of that team.

The play is set two years after the events of the first stage play, when the Hana-gumi have become senior students and gone their separate ways.

Majimuri Gakuen: Loudness (2021) 
In July 2021, a third stage play was announced, titled , and will be presented as a combination of stage play and concert.

The play is set two years after the events of the drama, with Nero and König set to confront Null, who has become the leader of Arashigaoka Student council.

References

External links
First season official website 
Second season official website 
Third season official website 
Fourth season official website 
Fifth season official website 
Stage play official website 

2010 Japanese television series debuts
AKB48
TV Tokyo original programming
Nippon TV dramas
Japanese drama television series
2010s high school television series
2010s teen drama television series
Television series by Sony Pictures Television
Japanese high school television series
Television series about teenagers
Stage play franchises
Hulu Japan original programming